Rich Hill Township is a township in Livingston County, in the U.S. state of Missouri.

Rich Hill Township was established in 1872, and so named on account of their fertile soil.

References

Townships in Missouri
Townships in Livingston County, Missouri